Viva Las Nowhere is a 2001 American-Canadian crime comedy-drama film directed by Jason Bloom and starring Daniel Stern, Patricia Richardson and James Caan.

Cast
 Daniel Stern as Frank Jacobs
 James Caan as Roy Baker
 Patricia Richardson as Helen / Wanda
 Lacey Kohl as Julie Mitchell
 Sherry Stringfield as Marguerite
 Larry Reese as Merle
 Andy Maton as Ed Babbit
 Shaun Johnston as Sheriff
 Tim Abell as Merle
 Daren Christofferson as Trooper #1
 Skerivet Daramola as Surveyor
 Taylor Pardell as Shawna Babbit
 Carrie Schiffler as Gracie
 Don Bland as Trooper #2
 Freddie Childress as Tattooed Prisoner
 Dan Duguay as Talent Show Performer

References

External links
 
 

American crime comedy-drama films
2000s crime comedy-drama films
2001 comedy-drama films
English-language Canadian films
2001 films
Films directed by Jason Bloom
Canadian crime comedy-drama films
2000s English-language films
2000s American films
2000s Canadian films